Mordellistena curticornis is a species of beetle in the genus Mordellistena of the family Mordellidae. It was discovered in 1977 and is endemic to Hungary.

References

curticornis
Beetles described in 1977
Endemic fauna of Hungary
Beetles of Europe